Bohdan Chornomaz (born 2 April 1996 in Pryluky, Ukraine) is a male Ukrainian athlete specialising in the 110 metres hurdles. He won a gold medal at the 2019 European Games. He is 2021 Ukrainian champion.

Personal bests
As of July 19, 2022.

Outdoor
 100 metres – 11.24 (Kyiv 2016)
 200 metres – 23.16 (Lutsk 2017)
 110 metres hurdles – 13.91 (Lutsk 2018)
 400 metres – 46.42 (Kropyvnytskiy 2018)
Indoor
 60 metres – 7.46 (Kyiv 2014)
 60 metres hurdles – 7.86 (Toruń 2021)

Personal life
His father Anatoliy Chornomaz competed as weightlifter in youth and junior competitions. His mother Svitlana Chornomaz is a former biathlete and she was a member of the Soviet national team.

His wife is Ukrainian athlete Natalya Pyrozhenko who competes in 400 metres and 800 metres. He works as a sports coach. He provided live television commentary of the 2022 World Athletics Championships for the Suspilne.

References

External links

1996 births
Living people
People from Pryluky
Ukrainian male hurdlers
Athletes (track and field) at the 2019 European Games
European Games medalists in athletics
European Games gold medalists for Ukraine